Histhan Mandali  is a village development committee in Myagdi District in the Dhaulagiri Zone of western-central Nepal. At the time of the 1991 Nepal census it had a population of 2206 people living in 514 individual households. Histhan Mandali most tourist spot in Myagdi District

References

External links
UN map of the municipalities of Myagdi District

Populated places in Myagdi District